Phillip Samuel Dunstone (4 October 1914 – 19 September 2000) was an Australian rules footballer who played with North Melbourne in the Victorian Football League (VFL).

His football career ended after he enlisted to serve in the Royal Australian Air Force in World War II and he was posted to serve in Papua New Guinea.

Notes

External links 

1914 births
2000 deaths
Australian rules footballers from Victoria (Australia)
North Melbourne Football Club players